Revd. Andrew J. Weinstein (Kiev, 1 May 1850 -  14 December 1915) was a British Anglican priest, deacon, diocesan chaplain and missionary.

Weinstein was born in Kiev, Russian Empire in a Jewish family, Yiddish was the first language he learned.

He was baptized as a Christian in 1870 while studying at a French college in Beirut. He graduated from King's College London in 1888 and was ordained deacon and became a missionary of the London Jews' Society (now CMJ). He was curator at St Andrew Undershaft (1890–93) and completed his studies at University College. In 1894 he traveled to South Africa and served as curator at St. James Church, Natal and was also rector at Christ Church, Polokwane, he also served churches in Vryburg and Dundee, KwaZulu-Natal. In 1907 he moved to New York and then went to Washington, where he served the Church of Our Savior as chaplain in 1908. In 1909 he went to Philadelphia and continued his work at St. Peter's Church and also served as a port chaplain until the day of his death.

Literature 
St. Peter's Church: Faith in Action for 250 Years Hardcover – Cordelia F. Biddle, Elizabeth S Brown, Alan J. Heavens and Charles P. Peitz (October 14, 2011 - Temple University Press, Philadelphia. - pp. 129–137

References

External links 
Jewish Presence - Clergy
The Living Church Volume 46 (Milwaukee, Wisconsin, 1911) p. 337
The Churchman's Year Book & American Church Almanac J. Heidingsfeld. 1916. p. 309
1 May 1850 Birth of Andrew Jacob Weinstein, much travelled “hidden servant” of God
http://www.stpetershistory.org/stpetershistoryweinstein.html
http://www.stpetershistory.org/stpetershistoryweinstein02.html
https://archive.org/details/directoryofprote00meye/page/6

1915 deaths 

British Jews 

Religious leaders from Kyiv

18th-century English Anglican priests
1850 births
Alumni of King's College London
Jews from the Russian Empire
Anglican chaplains
18th-century Protestants
Emigrants from the Russian Empire to the United Kingdom